Follicular fluid is a liquid which fills the follicular antrum and surrounds the ovum in an ovarian follicle.  This fluid is rich in hyaluronic acid, and is used in a modified intracytoplasmic sperm injection (ICSI) called physiological ICSI (PICSI), semi-viscous and yellow in colour. Its components come mainly from granulosa cells.

References

External links
 
 
 Diagram at med.mun.ca
 Overview at okstate.edu

Mammal female reproductive system